The Synagogue of Turin, also known as Israelite Temple, is a place of worship located in the city of Turin, Italy.

History 
After regaining their civil rights in the Kingdom of Sardinia through the institution of the Albertine Statute in 1848, the Jewish community wished to build a synagogue in Turin, in order to establish their presence in the Kingdom's capital. In 1859 the community tasked architect Alessandro Antonelli to build what would be their future temple, and works started swiftly. In 1875 it became clear that the architect's vision was beyond the scope, size, and budget of the community. For this reason, they chose to sell the half-completed building to the city in exchange for a sum of money and the land upon which the current-day synagogue stands. The building sold by the community would eventually become known as Mole Antonelliana. In 1880 architect Enrico Petiti started works for the present-day Moorish-style synagogue, was completed in 1884.

On November 20, 1942, Allied bombardments on the city completely destroyed the synagogue, with the exception of the exterior walls. It was rebuilt between 1945 and 1949 to its current status.

References 

Buildings and structures in Turin
Turin
Moorish Revival synagogues in Italy